Nicolas-Noël Boutet (31 August 1761 – 1833) was a French gunsmith and bladesmith who was director of the Versailles state arms factory. More than 600,000 weapons were produced under his directorship.

Biography
Boutet was born in Paris, the son of the royal gunsmith Noël Boutet, and became his father's assistant. In 1788, he married Leonie-Emilie Desainte, the daughter of his father's colleague, which gave him an even better position at court and the title of "gunmaker-in-ordinary" to King Louis XVI of France.

During the revolution he worked for Napoleon as director of the state arms manufactory.

He died in Paris.

See also
Flintlock
Napoleonic weaponry and warfare
W. W. Greener

References

Nicolas-Noël Boutet on American Society of Arms Collectors

1761 births
1833 deaths
Businesspeople from Paris
Gunsmiths
Firearm designers